Hellinsia benalcazari is a moth of the family Pterophoridae. It is found in Ecuador.

Etymology
The species is named after Sebastian de Benalcazar, lieutenant of Francisco Pizarro, the conquistador of South America.

References

Moths described in 2011
benalcazari
Moths of South America